The 2021 Colorado Buffaloes football team represented the University of Colorado Boulder during the 2021 NCAA Division I FBS football season. The Buffaloes were led by second-year head coach Karl Dorrell. They played their home games on campus at Folsom Field as a member of the South Division of the Pac-12 Conference.

Previous season

The Buffaloes finished the abbreviated 2020 regular season at 4–1 (3–1 in Pac-12, second in South Division), were invited to the Alamo Bowl, and lost to Texas.

Coaching staff

William Vlachos took over as the offensive line coach when Rodrigue was fired

Schedule

References

Colorado
Colorado Buffaloes football seasons
Colorado Buffaloes football